Doxocopa laurentia, the turquoise emperor or Cherubina emperor, is a species of butterfly of the family Nymphalidae, subfamily Apaturinae.

Description
The upperside of the wings is brown, with a broad metallic blue central band in males, while in the females this band is usually white, with a broad orange patch on the top of the forewings. The undersides of the wings are yellowish or greyish, with black markings on the forewings.

Like other members of the subfamily Apaturinae, the proboscis is green.

Distribution
This species occurs in Mexico, Brazil, Bolivia, Ecuador, Colombia, Peru and Argentina.

Subspecies
Doxocopa laurentia laurentia (Brazil and Argentina)
Doxocopa laurentia cherubina (C. & R. Felder, 1867) (Central America, Colombia, Bolivia and Peru)
Doxocopa laurentia thalysia (Fruhstorfer, 1907) (Ecuador)

Gallery

References

"Doxocopa laurentia (Godart, [1824])" at Markku Savela's Lepidoptera and Some Other Life Forms

External links
Neotropical butterflies
Learn about butterflies
Fauna of Paraguay

Apaturinae
Insects of Mexico
Fauna of Bolivia
Fauna of Ecuador
Fauna of Peru
Lepidoptera of Colombia
Fauna of Brazil
Nymphalidae of South America
Butterflies described in 1824